Clunk is the second extended play (EP) by Australian alternative rock group Frente!. The five-track EP, produced by Daniel Denholm, was released in March 1992 via the White Label imprint of Mushroom Records. It peaked at  3 on Australia's ARIA Singles Chart. Its lead track, "Ordinary Angels", won Breakthrough Artist – Single at ARIA Music Awards of 1993. That track also appeared on their debut album, Marvin the Album, in November and was released as a single in Europe and North America in 1993.

Track listing

Personnel
Frente!
 Simon Austin – lead guitar, vocals
 Angie Hart – lead vocals, cover art concept
 Tim O'Connor – bass guitar
 Mark Picton – drums, recorder

Production work
 Producer – Daniel Denholm, recorded at Platinum Studios, Melbourne
 Engineer – Rob Rowlands

Art work
 Art design – Louise Beach
 Photography – [band shot]: Sam Karanikos, [front cover pattern shot]: Louise Beach

Charts

Weekly charts

Year-end charts

Certifications

References

1992 EPs
EPs by Australian artists
Frente! albums
Indie pop EPs
Mushroom Records albums